All That: The Album is the soundtrack of musical performances and sketch clips from the hit Nickelodeon television series All That. It was released by Columbia Records, Interscope Records and Nick Records on November 26, 1996.

Track listing 
 "5 Minutes" (All That Dialogue) 0:14
 TLC - All That Theme Song 1:04
 "Good Burger/Good Weenie" (All That Dialogue) 0:26
 Immature featuring Smooth and Kel Mitchell as Ed from Good Burger - "Watch Me Do My Thing" 3:50
 Superdude (All That Dialogue) 0:24
 Brandy - "Baby" 5:12
 "Ed & Coolio" (All That Dialogue) 0:32
 Coolio - "Fantastic Voyage" 4:01
 "Vital Information" I (All That Dialogue) 0:09
 Mokenstef - "He's Mine" 4:13
 "Miss Fingerly V. Bacteria" (All That Dialogue) 0:18
 Soul For Real - "Candy Rain" 4:28
 "Coach Kreeton" (All That Dialogue) 0:08
 Aaliyah - "Age Ain't Nothing but a Number" 4:11
 "Loud Librarian" (All That Dialogue) 0:33
 Naughty By Nature - "Clap Yo Hands" 3:58
 "Earboy & Pizza Face" (All That Dialogue) 0:32
 Faith Evans - "You Used to Love Me" 4:28
 "Vital Information II" (All That Dialogue) 0:06
 Immature - "We Got It" 2:51
 TLC - "All That" - Outro Theme Song 1:13

Dialogues 
The album was created and recorded in 1994–1996. The songs were from musical guests in Season 1 (1994-1995) through Season 2 (1995-1996). The dialogues were directly from All That sketches like "Good Burger/Good Weenie", "Vital Information", and "Superdude". This CD was not released till a week after the premiere of Season 3, so Amanda Bynes is not in the CD, nor is Angelique Bates, due to her small number of characters in the show, but she was heard briefly in the "Miss Fingerly v. Bacteria" dialogue.

After the release of iCarly CD, it contained dialogues like All That: The Album, but they were recorded to recap certain episodes from the first season. The Drake & Josh soundtrack and Zoey 101: Music Mix did not contain any dialogues from their releases.

See also 
 All That

References

External links 

All That
Hip hop soundtracks
Television soundtracks
1996 soundtrack albums
Interscope Records soundtracks
Columbia Records soundtracks
Rhythm and blues soundtracks